Marcus Bergwall (born 11 January 1971) is a Swedish former bandy player who played as defender. Marcus is the older brother of teammate Andreas Bergwall. Marcus has played many games for Sweden's national team and played in several Bandy World Championships.

Career

Club career
Bergwall is a youth product of Lesjöfors and has represented Boltic, Hammarby, BolticGöta, Raketa, Sköndal/GT76, Dynamo Moscow, Vetlanda, IFK Kungälv, IFK Vänersborg, Karlstad Bandy, and Mosserud.

International career
Bergwall was part of Swedish World Champions teams of 1997, 2003, 2005, and 2009

Honours

Country 
 Sweden
 Bandy World Championship: 1997, 2003, 2005, 2009

References

External links
 

1971 births
Living people
Swedish bandy players
Expatriate bandy players in Russia
IF Boltic players
Hammarby IF Bandy players
Dynamo Kazan players
Dynamo Moscow players
Vetlanda BK players
IFK Kungälv players
IFK Vänersborg players
Sweden international bandy players
Bandy World Championship-winning players